Galaxy of Musicians is a painting by the Indian artist Raja Ravi Varma.

Description 
The painting shows a group of Indian women from various backgrounds playing their traditional instruments; from the Muslim courtesan on the right to the Nair woman  playing a veena on the left  and Marathi woman at centre the painting emphasizes the dresses and adornments of women from all over India. Originally painted for the Maharaja of Mysore, Ravi Varma focused in one painting on each group's customs and how they all characterized music.

See also
Raja Ravi Varma
There Comes Papa
Nair Lady Adorning Her Hair (Varma)

References

Citations

Bibliography
 
 
 

1889 paintings
Indian paintings
Raja Ravi Varma